Frank Michael Beyer (8 March 1928 – 20 April 2008) was a German composer.

Active as well as a composition teacher, performer and culture functionary, he was one of the leading figures in post-war Berlin musical life. His works have been programmed by many artists of international renown, and he has left an abundant oeuvre comprising works of all genres except opera. His avant-garde compositional style is clear, strict and sensitive, rooted in German modernism as well as in Bachian counterpoint and characteristics of human speech.

Life 
Beyer was born in Berlin, the son of the author and art historian Oskar Beyer and his wife Margarete, née Löwenfeld. He spent his childhood in Dresden and on Crete, as well as in Athens and Liechtenstein and received his early training in music from his father.  From 1946 to 1949 he studied composition and church music at the Kirchenmusikschule Berlin, before going on to study the piano in Leipzig from 1950 to 1953.

Beyer pursued his composition studies in Berlin under Ernst Pepping and 'virtuoso organ playing' under Joseph Ahrens at the Hochschule for Musik Berlin (now the Berlin University of the Arts). Johann Sebastian Bach and the Second Viennese School, especially Anton Webern, numbered among the composers who had the greatest influence on Beyer’s musical development. A strong focus on music in the family home also played a key role. He became acquainted with Bach’s music during his childhood while his father published a book on Bach which appeared in the Berlin Furche-Verlag in the 1920s.

From 1950 to 1963, Beyer worked as a church musician, both as performing organist and a conductor. He taught at the Kirchenmusikschule Berlin and subsequently at the Hochschule der Künste Berlin (Berlin University of the Arts). In 1964, he established the Musica nova sacra series and was a leading member of the Berliner Bach-Tage festival from 1970 to 1985. From 1986 to 2003, he was director of the music department at the Berlin University of the Arts. He founded the Institute for New Music in 1990 at the Berlin University of the Arts and the Berliner Orchesterkonferenz, which he also led.  From 1986 to 2006, he was a member of the senate at the Berlin University of the Arts. Beyer was also on the supervisory board of the German collecting society for music rights GEMA.

He died in Berlin.

Selected awards and honours 
 1958 Kunstpreis der Stadt Berlin for die Junge Generation (Berlin Art Prize for the Young Generation)
 1961 Bernhard Sprengel prize for chamber music
 1963 Villa Massimo fellowship (Rome); Villa Romana fellowship (Florence)
 1968 fellowship from the Cité des Arts Paris
 Member of the Berlin Academy of the Arts from 1979
 Member of the Bayerische Akademie der Schönen Künste (Bavarian Academy of Fine Arts) from 1981
 1997 guest of honour of the Villa Massimo (Rome)

List of works

Ballet 
 Geburt des Tanzes (1987), FP (under the ballet title "Orphische Szene") 1988, Deutsche Oper Berlin / Choreography: Tom Schilling
 Das Fenster (1991), features music from "Griechenland" (1981) and "Action" (1991), FP 1992 Hannover

Orchestra 
 Rondeau imaginaire (1972), FP 1973, Berlin Radio Symphony Orchestra (West Berlin) / Lorin Maazel
 Diaphonie (1975), FP 1976, Nuremberg Philharmonic Orchestra / Jiří Bělohlávek
 Notre-Dame-Musik (1983/84), FP 1984, Saarbrücken Radio Symphony Orchestra / Hubert Soudant
 Geburt des Tanzes (1987, based on the ballet), FP 1989, Berlin Radio Symphony Orchestra (West Berlin) / Lothar Zagrosek
 Klangtore (1996, rev.2001), FP 1997, Deutsches Symphonie-Orchester Berlin / Lothar Zagrosek
 Fuga fiammata (1999/2000), FP 2001, Symphonieorchester des Bayerischen Rundfunks / Ulf Schirmer

Chamber orchestra 
 Ricercare I (1957), FP 1958, Berlin Radio Symphony Orchestra (West Berlin) / Wolfgang Sawallisch
 Versi (1968), FP 1968, Berlin Philharmonic / Hans Zender
 Concertino a tre (1974), FP 1974 Schwetzingen
 Streicherfantasien nach einem Motiv von J. S. Bach (1977, also arrangement for string quintet), FP 1980, Berlin Philharmonic / Giuseppe Sinopoli
 Griechenland, Music for 3 groups of strings (1981), FP 1982, Berlin Philharmonic / Seiji Ozawa
 Liturgia (based on String Quartet No. 3 “Missa”) (1996), FP 1997, Berlin Radio Symphony Orchestra / Lawrence Foster
 Passionato con Arietta, Elegy for strings (2005), FP 2006 Diez an der Lahn

Solo instrument(s) and orchestra 
 Concerto for flute and string orchestra (1967)
 Deutsche Tänze for cello and double bass with chamber orchestra (1982), FP 1984 Berlin
 Mysteriensonate for orchestra with solo viola (1986), FP 1987, Berlin Radio Symphony Orchestra (West Berlin) / Sylvain Cambreling
 Concerto for oboe and string orchestra (1986), FP 1987, Hansjörg Schellenberger / Berlin Philharmonic / Erich Leinsdorf
 Musik der Frühe, Concerto for violin and orchestra (1992/93), FP 1993, Kolja Blacher / Rundfunk-Sinfonieorchester Berlin / Hanns-Martin Schneidt
 Canto di giorno for cello and orchestra (1998/99), FP 1999, Michael Sanderling / Berlin Radio Symphony Orchestra / Giuseppe Mega
 Canzona di Ombra for oboe and strings (cadenza and final movement from Concerto for oboe and string orchestra, 1986/2003)
 Concerto Notte di pasqua for viola and orchestra (2003–04/06), FP 2007, Tabea Zimmermann / Deutsches Symphonie-Orchester Berlin / Jonathan Stockhammer
 Meridian, Concerto for flute and string ensemble (2004/05), FP 2008, Emmanuel Pahud / Kammerakademie Potsdam / Michael Sanderling

Ensemble and chamber music 
 String Quartet No. 1 (1954/56)
 Sonata for viola and organ (1962)
 Tiento for flute and organ (1965)
 Concerto for organ and seven instruments (1966/69) FP 1969 Peter Schwarz / Kassel Ensemble
 String Quartet No. 2 (1969) FP 1969 Assmann Quartet, Berlin
 Wind Quintet (1972) FP 1973 Berlin, SWF Baden-Baden Wind Quintet
 Violin Sonata (1977) FP 1978 Berlin, Saschko Gawriloff / Lothar Broddack
 De lumine, Music for chamber ensemble (1978) FP 1979 „das neue Werk“ Hamburg / Dieter Cichewiecz
 Trio for oboe, viola and harp (1980) FP 1981 Mannheim, Heinz Holliger / Ursula Holliger
 Deutsche Tänze for cello and double bass (1980) FP 1980 Vienna, Jörg Baumann / Klaus Stoll
 Fantasia concertante for 2 violins (1982) FP 1984 Hofheim, Boeckheler / Assmann
 Passacaglia fantastica for piano trio (1984) FP 1986 Ludwigsburg, Stuttgart Piano Trio
 String Quartet No. 3 Missa (1985) FP 1985 Berlin, Wilanow Quartet
 Symphonies for Eight Voices (1988) FP 1989, Scharoun Ensemble Berlin
 Architettura per musica for ensemble (1989) FP 1989 Berlin, musica-viva Ensemble Dresden
 Sanctus for saxophone quartet (1990)
 Gesta Romanorum for ensemble (1990)
 Action for percussion ensemble (1991)  FP 1993, Super Nova Percussion Ensemble Berlin
 Canciones for clarinet and ensemble (1991) FP 1991,  Alois Brandhofer / Berlin Philharmonic / Peter Keuschnig
 Clarinet Quintet (1992) FP 1993 Stuttgart, Ulf Rodenhäuser
 Nachtstück for oboe and piano (1993) FP 1994 Düsseldorf, Christian Schneider / Frank Michael Beyer
 Nänie for 2 guitars (1994) FP 1994 Lüneburg, Evers / Weigel
 Taglied for cello and piano (1998) FP 1998 Berlin, Georg Faust / Rolf Koenen
 „Windklang“ for string trio (2000) FP 2003 Stuttgart, Ingolf Turban / Kolja Lessing / Wen-Sinn Yang
 Was Orpheus sah for string quartet (2003) FP 2004 Berlin, Vogler-Quartett
 Voca for 3 trumpets (2004) FP 2004 Hamburg
 Lichtspuren for piano trio (2006) FP 2008 Kempen, Trio Wanderer
 Zu den Inseln, Suite for 9 instruments (2005/06) FP 2008 München, Konstantia Gourzi, cond.
 Choreographie, Three Mythical Dances for 12 cellos (2007)

Solo instruments 
 Toccata in Re for organ (1952) FP 1953 Berlin, Frank Michael Beyer
 Lays for organ (1957)
 Variationen for piano (1957)
 Toccaten sub communione for organ (1970) FP 1970 Nuremberg, Peter Schwarz
 Chaconne (1970)
 Tiento II for organ (1972) FP 1973 Berlin, Frank Michael Beyer
 Canti dei misteri for organ (1979)
 Messesätze (Josquin/Beyer) for organ (1979)
 Canzonetta for guitar (1980)
 Avanti, 15 Piano Pieces for Young Players (1983)
 Melos I & II for viola (1983/1990)
 Das Geläut zu Speyer for organ (1984)
 Echo for bass flute (1985)
 Lobgesang „Wurze des Waldes“ for organ (1992)
 Imago for cello (2002)
 Wie ein fernes Lied for oboe (cadenza from Concerto for oboe and string orchestra, for separate performance, 2004/05)
 Metamorphosen – Hommage à A. Skrjabin for violin (2007) FP 2008 Berlin, Viviane Hagner

Voice 
 Biblische Szenen for mezzo-soprano and tenor (or soprano and baritone) and ensemble (1955)
 Sprache der Liebenden for baritone, chamber chorus and orchestra (1961); words by Friedrich Hölderlin
 Lavatio – Manifestatio Christi for mixed chorus a cappella (1962)
 Maior Angelis for soprano, female chorus and ensemble (1970) FP 1970 Berlin, Catherine Gayer / Kammerchor Ernst Senff / Frank Michael Beyer
 Canticum Mose et Agni for eight-part chorus a cappella (1976) FP 1977 Berlin, Monteverdi Choir / John Eliot Gardiner
 Et resurrexit, Motets for twelve-part chorus a cappella (2001/02) FP 2003, Rundfunkchor Berlin / Simon Halsey

Arrangements 
 Drei Psalmen for baritone and piano by Boris Blacher, arranged for baritone and ensemble by Frank Michael Beyer (1943, arr.1966)
 Musikalisches Opfer, The Contrapunctual Movements: Ricercare a 3, Fuga canonica & 9 Kanons, by Johann Sebastian Bach, arranged for chamber orchestra by Frank Michael Beyer for performance together with Bach’s Ricercare a 6 in the arrangement by Anton Webern (arr.1985) FP 1985 Berlin, London Sinfonietta / Diego Masson
 Cadenza dolce for the Andante in C Major for flute and orchestra K315 by Wolfgang Amadeus Mozart (2007) FP 2008 Berlin, Emmanuel Pahud

Students 
 Nikolaus Brass (1949)
 Orm Finnendahl (1963)
 Detlev Glanert (1960)
 Konstantia Gourzi (1962)
 Hanspeter Kyburz (1960)
 Marc Lingk (1964)
 Gerhardt Müller-Goldboom (1953)
 Isabel Mundry (1963)
 Thomas Schmidt-Kowalski (1949)
 Charlotte Seither (1965)
 Preethi de Silva (1942)
 Art-Oliver Simon (1966)
 André Werner (1960)

Literature 
 Werner Grünzweig & Daniela Reinhold (ed.): "Frank Michael Beyer". Archive zur Musik des 20. Jahrhunderts. Vol.2. Wolke Verlag, 1998, .
 Andreas Richter: "Der Komponist und Vorsitzende der Berliner Orchesterkonferenz Frank Michael Beyer im Gespräch", in Das Orchester 01/1995.
 Alain Pâris: Klassische Musik im 20. Jahrhundert. Instrumentalisten, Sänger, Dirigenten, Orchester, Chöre. transl. by Rudolf Kimmig, rev. by Ralf Noltensmeier. With an introduction by Peter Gülke, Deutscher Taschenbuch Verlag, 2nd edition 1997, .

References

External links 
 Audio samples from compositions by Frank Michael Beyer from Boosey and Hawkes 
 View scores of selected works by Frank Michael Beyer online
 Profile of Frank Michael Beyer at the Academy of the Arts (German) 
 Akademie der Künste – music archive: Frank Michael Beyer | musical facsimiles & prints
 Obituary on Deutschlandradio Kultur, 22 April 2008
 "Kannst du mich komponieren?" Interview with Frank Michael Beyer by Klaus Georg Koch, Berliner Zeitung 16 June 1999

1928 births
2008 deaths
German composers
German male conductors (music)
Members of the Academy of Arts, Berlin
20th-century German conductors (music)
20th-century German male musicians